Marek Melenovský  (born March 30, 1977) is a Czech former professional ice hockey player. He was selected by the Toronto Maple Leafs in the 7th round (171st overall) of the 1995 NHL Entry Draft.

Melenovský played with HC Karlovy Vary in the Czech Extraliga during the 2010–11 Czech Extraliga season.

Career statistics

Regular season and playoffs

International

References

External links 

 
 

1977 births
Czech ice hockey centres
HC Karlovy Vary players
Living people
Toronto Maple Leafs draft picks
People from Humpolec
Sportspeople from the Vysočina Region
Czech expatriate ice hockey players in Canada